In communication studies, science communication, psycholinguistics and choice theory, anecdotal value refers to the primarily social and political value of an anecdote or anecdotal evidence in promoting understanding of a social, cultural, or economic phenomenon. While anecdotal evidence is typically unscientific, in the last several decades the evaluation of anecdotes has received sustained academic scrutiny from economists and scholars such as Felix Salmon, S. G. Checkland (on David Ricardo), Steven Novella, R. Charleton, Hollis Robbins, Kwamena Kwansah-Aidoo, and others. These academics seek to quantify the value of the use of anecdotes, e.g. in promoting public awareness of a disease. More recently, economists studying choice models have begun assessing anecdotal value in the context of framing; Daniel Kahneman and Amos Tversky suggest that choice models may be contingent on stories or anecdotes that frame or influence choice.  As an example, consider the quote, widely misattributed to Joseph Stalin:  The death of one man is a tragedy, the death of millions is a statistic.<ref>Solovyova, Julia (October 28, 1997) Mustering Most Memorable Quips , The Moscow Times states: "Russian historians have no record of the lines, 'Death of one man is a tragedy. Death of a million is a statistic,' commonly attributed by English-language dictionaries to Josef Stalin." Discussion of the book by Konstantin Dushenko, Dictionary of Modern Quotations (Словарь современных цитат: 4300 ходячих цитат и выражений ХХ века, их источники, авторы, датировка). See also Joseph Stalin in Wikiquote.</ref>

 See also 
 Allais paradox
 Availability heuristic
 Informational cascade

 Notes 

 References 
 Choices, values and frames'', Daniel Kahneman and Amos Tversky (Eds.). Cambridge: Cambridge University Press, 840 pp., 
 Telling Stories: The Epistemological Value of Anecdotes in Ghanaian communication research
 The Role of Anecdotes in Science-Based Medicine

Behavioral finance
Evidence law